Yalemzerf Yehualaw Densa (born 3 August 1999) is an Ethiopian long-distance runner. She won the 2022 London Marathon. Yehualaw is the current world record holder in the 10 kilometres road race, sits second on the world all-time list at the half marathon and tenth on the respective world all-time list for the marathon.

Yehualaw recorded the fastest ever women's marathon debut at the time at the 2022 Hamburg Marathon.

Early life and background
Yalemzerf Yehualaw was born the eldest of six siblings in Finote Selam in the West Gojjam area of the Amhara Region. Her name means in Amharic 'edge of the world'.

She was winning track races at school from the age of 12 and later also youth track titles in her highly-competitive region. With wins on the track, road and cross country, she was invited to join the Ethiopian Youth Sport Academy in Addis Ababa where she currently lives, and then, after four years in 2017, to join the NN Running Team coached by Tessema Abshero.

Career

2019–2021 
A 19-year-old Yehualaw made her international debut in April 2019 at the Rabat Half Marathon in Morocco, where she took victory. The same year, she represented Ethiopia at the African Games held also in Rabat and won the women's half marathon event, breaking Games record in a time of 1:10:26. She also won the Great Ethiopian Run, a 10 kilometres road race in Addis Ababa, setting a new course record of 31:55.

She earned the bronze medal in the women's half marathon at the postponed 2020 World Half Marathon Championships held in Gdynia, Poland, just three seconds behind gold medallist Peres Jepchirchir. A month later in November, Yehualaw competed at the Delhi Half Marathon in India where she faced a world-class field. In most impressive performance of her career up to that point, she won the race in a time of 1:04:46, the second-fastest women's time ever recorded for the distance, beating world record-holder Ababel Yeshaneh and 2019 World marathon champion Ruth Chepng'etich.

In August 2021, Yehualaw competed in the Antrim Coast Half Marathon in Northern Ireland setting a new world record time of 63m 44s, the first women's mark under 64 minutes not ratified because the course was 54 metres short. She ran legal 63m 51s in October at the Valencia Half Marathon thus securing second mark on the world all-time list behind team-mate Letesenbet Gidey, who set a world record in this race.

2022: World 10 km record and London Marathon win
In January, after having to withdraw from the Valencia 10 km two weeks earlier, Yehualaw bettered her own course record at the Great Ethiopian Run with a time of 31:17, the fastest 10 km ever recorded at altitude.

On 27 February, she ran again 10 kilometres and set a new world record in the women's event in Castellón, Spain, slicing 24 seconds off the yet-unratified mark held by Bahrain's Kalkidan Gezahegne since 2021, with a clocking of 29 minutes 14 seconds. At the time Kenya's Joyciline Jepkosgei held the ratified record of 29:43, set in 2017. Only two women ever had run faster over the distance on the track. She covered the first 5 km in 14:28 – just nine seconds slower than the world record for this distance.

In April, in her anticipated first marathon, Yehualaw achieved the fastest ever women's marathon debut of 2:17:23 at the Hamburg Marathon, breaking the Ethiopian record, German all-comers' record, and putting her sixth on the world all-time list. She won by almost nine minutes (around three kilometres) in windy conditions.

The 23-year-old successfully defended her Antrim Coast Half Marathon title in August, setting the UK all-comers' record with her joint fifth-fastest ever time of 64m 22s.

On 2 October, Yehualaw took her first victory at a World Marathon Major at the 2022 London Marathon, becoming the youngest ever female winner of the London event. She clocked 2:17:26, only three seconds outside her personal best, after she fell over with about 10km to go. She then soon broke clear of Joyciline Jepkosgei in second, with 24th mile in a quick 4:43 according to initial reports  the fastest split in women's marathon history. Her finishing time was the third-fastest women's mark in the London event history, behind only the world records set by Paula Radcliffe (2:15:25) and Mary Keitany (2:17:01, women-only).

2023–present
Chasing her own world 10 km record in windy conditions at the 10K Valencia Ibercaja in January, she missed it by 5 seconds to set a course record of 29:19, the second-fastest all-time performance in the event.

Personal bests

Achievements

Notes

References

External links
 

1999 births
Living people
Ethiopian female long-distance runners
Ethiopian female marathon runners
African Games gold medalists for Ethiopia
African Games medalists in athletics (track and field)
Athletes (track and field) at the 2019 African Games
African Games gold medalists in athletics (track and field)
Sportspeople from Amhara Region
21st-century Ethiopian women
London Marathon female winners
People from Finote Selam